American Cigar Factory, also known as Stone Manufacturing Company, is a historic factory building located at Greenville, South Carolina. It was built about 1902, and is a four-story, rectangular brick building with segmental arch openings.  It has a low-pitched gable roof with a projecting eave and floors supported by wooden posts.

It was added to the National Register of Historic Places in 1982.

References

Industrial buildings and structures on the National Register of Historic Places in South Carolina
Industrial buildings completed in 1902
National Register of Historic Places in Greenville, South Carolina
Historic cigar factories
Tobacco buildings in the United States